Zonocyba is a genus of true bugs belonging to the family Cicadellidae.

The species of this genus are found in Europe and Northern America.

Species:
 Zonocyba bifasciata (Boheman, 1851) 
 Zonocyba hockingensis (Knull, 1945)

References

Cicadellidae
Hemiptera genera